Attila Pintér (born 7 May 1966) is a Hungarian football manager and former player. He is most known for being the head coach of the Hungarian national football team from 19 December 2013 until 18 September 2014.

Managerial career

Ferencváros
Pintér won the Hungarian League title with Ferencváros in the 2003–04 season. Pintér also could win the Hungarian Cup in 2004. He was dismissed from the club in 2004 after what was claimed to be a contract negotiation problem. Shortly after, the players of the club released a statement about Pintér's apparent behaviour during his tenure: according to the team, profanity, hazing, racist slurs and bullying was commonplace.

Sopron
Pintér won the Hungarian Cup in 2005 with Sopron.

Győr
Attila Pintér became the coach of the Győri ETO FC in 2009. During his coaching the team finished third in the Hungarian League 2009–10 season after beating Videoton FC in the last round. 
On international turf the team entered the Europa League 2010-11 season. In the first qualifying round Győr played their first match against FC Nitra. The final result was 2–2. In the second leg Attila Pintér's team could win 3–1 at the ETO Park. In the second qualifying round Győr played their first match in Kazakhstan against Atyrau. The match finished 2–0 to Győr thanks to the goals of Linas Pilibaitis and Fouad Bouguerra. In the second leg Győr could win 2–0. The goals were scored by Rati Aleksidze and Mihai Nicorec. In the third qualifying round Győr played with the French Montpellier HSC. The first match was played at the ETO Park and the final result was 1–0 to the French team. The only goal of the match was scored by Olivier Giroud. In the second leg Győr won 1–0. The only goal was scored by Valentin Babić. In extra time there were no more goals therefore the teams had to decide the match in the penalty shootout. Győr won 4–3 on penalties and entered the play-offs of the Europa League. Győr played the Croatian Dinamo Zagreb in the play-off of the Europa League 2010-11. The first match was won by Zagreb 2–0. In the second leg at the Stadion Maksimir Győr lost to 2–1 and were eliminated from the Europa League on 4–1 aggregate.
Due to the increase of the number of matches the team were unable to do well both in the Hungarian League and in the Europa League. The results in the domestic league were not satisfying for the management, therefore Attila Pintér and the management mutually terminated the contract between each other and the management appointed Aurél Csertői as the manager.

On 12 May 2013, Attila Pintér's Győr ended a 30-year wait for the Hungarian League title by beating Ferencvárosi TC at home by 1–0, while their rival Videoton FC lost to Debreceni VSC 2–1 in the 27th weekday of the championship. In the 2012–13 season they went on a 22-match unbeaten run before back-to-back defeats knocked them off their stride. But neither Videoton FC nor MTK Budapest FC could sustain the challenge therefore Győr could wrap up their fourth title with room to spare.  

On 22 May 2013, Pintér could have led Győr to double their success by winning the 2012–13 Magyar Kupa against Debreceni VSC at the Bozsik Stadion, Budapest. Győr was winning by 1–0 thanks to the goal by Nemanja Andrić in the 19th minute but in the second half Debrecen's Adamo Coulibaly scored two goals which resulted Debrecen's victory over Győr in the Hungarian Cup final.

Hungary
On 19 December 2013, Pintér was appointed as the head coach of the Hungarian national football team by the head of the Hungarian Football Federation, Sándor Csányi, in Telki. Some has seen this decision as controversial, given Pintér's low popularity with fans and players alike. On 7 September 2014, Hungary were defeated by Northern Ireland by 2–1 at the newly built Groupama Arena on the first matchday of the UEFA Euro 2016 qualifying. Pintér was subsequently dismissed, with Pál Dárdai appointed as a temporary replacement for three matches.

Szalai controversy
After the 8–1 defeat of the Hungarian national side against the Netherlands, Szalai gave an interview about the reasons behind the long-term underachievement of the national side. Szalai has not been called up to play for Hungary since.

On 13 November 2013, Pintér reacted on Szalai's criticism and doubted Szalai's honesty. Pintér claimed that Szalai said in an interview before the 8–1 defeat that he does not have any problems with Hungary coach Sándor Egervári. Pintér criticised Szalai for being irresponsible for criticising the Hungarian coaches since Szalai does not know them.

On 5 March 2014, Hungary played their first match, ended in a 2–1 defeat, against Finland in Győr's ETO Park in the year and Szalai was left out. In an interview with Nemzeti Sport, Szalai said that he cannot say anything about his future with the national team since he was not invited and he did not have the option to decide whether to join or not.

On 28 August 2014, Pintér appointed the footballers of the Hungarian national side against the upcoming UEFA Euro 2016 qualifier against Northern Ireland at the Groupama Arena on 7 September 2014. Szalai was left out from the team.

On 4 September 2014, Szalai posted an announcement on his Facebook profile saying that he doesn't want to play for Hungary during the management of Pintér. Szalai became the second Hungarian footballer in the past 20 years who resigned from the Hungarian national side after the resignation of Szabolcs Huszti in 2007.

Honours

Player

Club
Ferencváros
Hungarian League: 1988–89, 1990–91
Hungarian Cup: 1991

Manager

Ferencváros
Hungarian League: 2003–04
Hungarian Cup: 2004

Sopron
Hungarian Cup: 2005

Győr
Hungarian League: 2012–13

International goals

Managerial statistics

References

1966 births
Living people
People from Salgótarján
Hungarian football managers
Hungarian footballers
Hungary youth international footballers
Hungary international footballers
Nemzeti Bajnokság I players
Ferencvárosi TC managers
Ferencvárosi TC footballers
Győri ETO FC managers
Győri ETO FC players
Vasas SC managers
Vasas SC players
Beerschot A.C. players
Budapesti VSC footballers
FC DAC 1904 Dunajská Streda players
Hungarian expatriate footballers
Expatriate footballers in Czechoslovakia
Hungarian expatriate sportspeople in Czechoslovakia
Expatriate footballers in Belgium
Hungarian expatriate sportspeople in Belgium
Association football defenders
Puskás Akadémia FC managers
Mezőkövesdi SE managers
Nemzeti Bajnokság I managers
Sportspeople from Nógrád County